Rumana is an Arab village in northern Israel. Located near Nazareth, it falls under the jurisdiction of al-Batuf Regional Council.

History
The Palestine Exploration Fund's Survey of Western Palestine found cisterns and rock-cut caves, and traces of ancient remains at this village.

Sherds ascribed to the  Early Bronze Age I  and the Intermediate Bronze Age have been found, as well as a cluster of sherds from the  Iron Age II (tenth–eighth centuries BCE). A building with sherds from the Iron Age II and the  Persian  era have also been excavated.

Graves dating to the  Persian  era and remains of an architectural complex from the Roman era (first–third centuries CE) have been excavated here.

It has been suggested that Rumana was  Romette, a casuale belonging to the Knights Hospitallers in the Crusader era.

A small number of remains from the  Mamluk era has also been found.

Ottoman era
It had a population of 9 households, all Muslim. The villagers paid taxes on wheat, barley, fruit trees,   cotton, goats and beehives. Pierre Jacotin called  the village Roumani on his map in 1799.

Biblical scholar Edward Robinson passed by the village in 1852, and assumed it was the ancient Rimmon of the Tribe of Zebulun. French explorer Victor Guérin described  the village in the 1870s as being small, and protected from the outside  by a continuous wall, and hedges of cactus. He also found many fine remains from former times and also speculates that it might  be the Biblical site of Rimon, which is mentioned in the Book of Joshua. (Joshua 19:13)  In Palestine Exploration Fund's  1881 Survey of Western Palestine, the village (called Rummaneh)  was described as: A small village built of stone, and containing about 70 Moslems. It is situated on a low ridge above the plain, and there are a few olive-trees around. The water supply is from cisterns and a well.

A population list from about 1887 showed that  er Rummaneh had about  40 Muslim inhabitants.

British Mandate era
In the  1922 census of Palestine conducted  by the British Mandate authorities,  Rummaneh had a population of 37, of which 33 were Muslims and 4 Christians. The  Christians were all  Melkite.  

In the  1931 census the population was counted with nearby Rumat al-Heib, and together they had  197 inhabitants;  195 Muslims and 2 Christians, in a total of 36 houses.

In the 1945 statistics  the population was 590, all Muslims while the total land area was 1,493 dunams, according to an official land and population survey.  Of  this,  28 dunams were allocated  for plantations and irrigable land, 796 for cereals, while 5 dunams were classified as built-up areas.

State of Israel
In 1948 the village was captured by the Israeli army during Operation Dekel, 15–18 July. It remained under martial law until 1966.

References

Bibliography

 
 

 
 
   

 
 
 

 
(p. 404)

External links
Welcome To Rummana
Survey of Western Palestine, Map 6:  IAA, Wikimedia commons 

Arab villages in Israel
Al-Batuf Regional Council
Populated places in Northern District (Israel)